J.C. (Clarence) "Pappy" Hoel (May 30, 1904 – February 1, 1989) was a motorcycle racer, dealer, businessman, and founder of the Sturgis Motorcycle Rally. In 1983, he received the American Motorcyclist Association's (AMA) Dud Perkins Award for outstanding contributions to motorcycling. Both J.C. "Pappy" Hoel and his wife Pearl were inducted to the Motorcycle Hall of Fame in 1998.
Pappys family spans across the United States and Manitoba, Canada. Robert Hoel and sons Barry Hoel and Steven Hoel live in Winnipeg Manitoba. 
Pappy Hoel campground in South Dakota holds thousands of visitor's yearly for the Sturgis rally. The campground opened in 2016 on the site of a campground operating under another name.

References

External links 
 J.C. Hoel, at AMA Motorcycle Hall of Fame
 
 J.C. "Pappy" Hoel, Sturgis Museum and Hall of Fame.
 Pappy Hoel Campground, Pappy Hoel Campground and Resort in Sturgis, South Dakota is home to the world's largest biker pool and hottest concerts and events in Sturgis.

1904 births
1989 deaths
People from Sturgis, South Dakota
Sturgis Motorcycle Rally people